The 2014–15 season  are Foolad's 13th season in the Persian Gulf Pro League. They competed in the Hazfi Cup which they were eliminated by Parseh Tehran in Round 5. They also will competing at AFC Champions League. Foolad is captained by Bakhtiar Rahmani.

Players
Last updated on 21 April 2015

Transfers

In

Out

Pre-season and friendlies

Competition record

Overall

Iran Pro League

Standings

Results by round

Matches

Hazfi Cup

AFC Champions League

Group stage

Statistics

Top scorers

References

External links
Iran Premier League Statistics
Persian League

Foolad F.C. seasons
Foolad F.C.